Andreas Zehrer (born 10 March 1966) is an Austrian equestrian. He competed in two events at the 2004 Summer Olympics.

References

1966 births
Living people
Austrian male equestrians
Olympic equestrians of Austria
Equestrians at the 2004 Summer Olympics